Liam McLean (born 30 January 1989), better known by his stage name Joker, is a British record producer who creates music in genres such as dubstep and grime and was known for creating the subgenre "purple sound". He was named "2009 king of bass music" by XLR8R magazine and was featured in the September 2009 issue of The Wire magazine. He has contributed to two releases produced by the London-based record company Hyperdub. He also runs his own label known as Kapsize Recordings. His debut album, The Vision, was released on 31 October 2011 through independent label 4AD. His sophomore LP, The Mainframe, was released on 16 February 2015 through his own Kapsize imprint.

Discography

Studio albums
The Vision (4AD, 2011)
The Mainframe (Kapsize, 2015)

Singles and EPs
Kapsize EP (Earwax, 2007)
"Holly Brook Park" / "80's" (Kapsize, 2008)
"Play Doe" / "Tempered" (Joker & Rustie / Rustie) (Kapsize, 2008)
"3K Lane" / "Modem" (Jakes vs Joker / Jakes) (H.E.N.C.H / Terrorhythm, 2008)
"Snake Eater" / "Move Dis" (Joker / TRG) (Soul Motive, 2008)
Top of the Game EP (Terrorhythm, 2008)
"Do It" / "Psychedelic Runway" (Kapsize, 2009)
"Digidesign" / "You Don't Know What Love Is" (Joker / 2000F & J Kamata) (Hyperdub, 2009)
"Purple City" / "Re-Up" (with Ginz) (Kapsize, 2009)
"Untitled_rsn" (Tectonic, 2009)
Hyperdub 5.2 EP (Joker & Ginz / Zomby / Samiyam) (Hyperdub, 2009)
"City Hopper" / "Output 1-2" (Tectonic, 2009)
"Tron" (Kapsize, 2010)
Gully Goon Estate EP (with Terror Danjah & Illmana) (Hardrive, 2011)
"The Vision (Let Me Breathe)" (featuring Jessie Ware & Freddie Gibbs) (4AD, 2011)
"Slaughter House" (featuring Silas of Turboweekend) (4AD, 2011)
The Vision Instrumentals (4AD, 2011)
"On My Mind" (featuring William Cartwright) (Goldie & Rustie mixes) (4AD, 2011)
"Lost" (featuring Buggsy & Otis Brown) (incl. Redlight Remix) (4AD, 2012)
"Skitta" / "I Think You Should Know" (featuring Newham Generals) (Kapsize, 2012)
"Old Era" (Kapsize, 2012)
Face Off EP (Kapsize, 2013)
Headtop EP (Kapsize, 2014)
"Midnight" (Kapsize, 2014)
The Phoenix EP (Kapsize, 2016)
XXIV Bit EP (Kapsize, 2016)
Fantasy (Kapsize, 2017)
Mad Night / Melkweg Bass (Kapsize, 2017)
Anamorphic / Forever (Kapsize, 2018)
Marching Orders / Polka Dot (Kapsize, 2018)
Boat / Deploy (Kapsize, 2018)
"Tears" W Skrillex & Sleepnet (OWSLA/Atlantic records, 2023)

Notes

References

External links
 Joker discography on Boomkat
 

4AD artists
1989 births
Dubstep musicians
Grime music artists
English electronic musicians
English record producers
Electronic dance music DJs
Hyperdub artists
Living people
Musicians from Bristol
DJs from Bristol